Kenya Plant Health Inspectorate Service (KEPHIS) is a government regulatory agency responsible for Assurance on the quality of Agriculture inputs and produce. It was formed under Plant Protection Act, (Cap 324) and its mission is to provide a science based regulatory service by assuring plant health, quality of agricultural inputs and produce for food security, globally competitive agriculture and sustainable development.

External links 
Kenya Plant Health Inspectorate Service

Manufacturing and Agriculture
Phytosanitary authorities